American R&B singer SZA has won 25 awards from 66 nominations; including a Grammy Award, two Billboard Music Awards, two MTV Video Music Awards, among others. In 2017, she released her debut album Ctrl to critical acclaim, the album was nominated for Album of the Year at the Soul Train Music Awards and for the Grammy Award for Best Urban Contemporary Album. Also that year she released several singles from the album like "The Weekend" and "Love Galore" with American rapper Travis Scott with both songs receiving Grammy Award nominations for Best R&B Performance and Best Rap/Sung Performance respectively. At the 60th Annual Grammy Awards she was nominated for five awards including Best New Artist. In 2018 she collaborated with Kendrick Lamar in the song "All the Stars" for the action movie Black Panther. The song received four nominations at the 61st Annual Grammy Awards including Record of the Year and Song of the Year, along with Golden Globe Award nomination for Best Original Song and an Academy Award nomination for Best Original Song as well.

In 2021 she featured on "Kiss Me More" with Doja Cat, the song was commercially successful and won the Best Pop Duo/Group Performance, being SZA's first Grammy Award after nine nominations. The song also won an American Music Award, a Billboard Music Award, a MTV Video Music Awards, and was nominated for Song of the Year and Record of the Year at the 64th Annual Grammy Awards. In 2023, she released her second studio album SOS to both critical acclaim and commercial success, peaking at number one at the Billboard 200 chart.

Academy Awards
The Academy Awards are a set of 24 awards for artistic and technical merit in the film industry, given annually by the Academy of Motion Picture Arts and Sciences (AMPAS), to recognize excellence in cinematic achievements as assessed by the Academy's voting membership.

African-American Film Critics Association Awards 
The African-American Film Critics Association Awards is the world's largest group of Black film critics that give various annual awards for excellence in film and television.

American Music Awards
The American Music Awards (AMAs) is an annual music awards show created by Dick Clark in 1973. SZA has received five nominations and one award.

ASCAP Rhythm and Soul Music Awards

BET Awards

Billboard Music Awards
The Billboard Music Awards are held to honor artists for commercial performance in the U.S., based on record charts published by Billboard magazine. SZA has received two awards from eight nominations.

Billboard Women in Music
Billboard Women in Music is an annual event held by Billboard and were established to recognize "women in the music industry who have made significant contributions to the business and who, through their work and continued success, inspire generations of women to take on increasing responsibilities within the field".

Black Reel Awards 
The Black Reel Awards  is an annual American awards ceremony hosted by the Foundation for the Augmentation of African-Americans in Film (FAAAF) to recognize excellence of African-Americans in the global film industry.

BMI Awards
The BMI Awards are held annually by Broadcast Music, Inc. to award songwriters in various genres, including Hip-Hop/R&B, country and pop.

BMI R&B/Hip-Hop Awards

BMI London Awards

BMI Pop Awards 
{| class="wikitable plainrowheaders" style="width:70%;
|-
! scope="col" style="width:4%;"| Year
! scope="col" style="width:50%;"| Category
! scope="col" style="width:35%;"| Nominated work
! scope="col" style="width:6%;"| Result
! scope="col" style="width:6%;"| 
|-
| 2019
| Award Winning Songs
| "What Lovers Do"
| 
| style="text-align:center;|

Brit Awards

Critics Choice Music Awards

GAFFA Awards

GAFFA Awards (Sweden)
Delivered since 2010, the GAFFA Awards (Swedish: GAFFA Priset) are a Swedish award that rewards popular music awarded by the magazine of the same name.

Georgia Film Critics Association

Gold Derby Awards

Golden Globe Awards

Grammy Awards
The Grammy Awards are presented annually by The Recording Academy. SZA has received one win from fourteen nominations.

Guild of Music Supervisors Awards

Hollywood Music in Media Awards
The Hollywood Music in Media Awards (HMMA) honors music in film, television, video games, commercials, and trailers. Nominations are determined by an advisory board and selection committee comprised by journalists, music executives, songwriters, and composers. SZA won one award.

iHeart Radio Music Awards
The iHeart Radio Music Awards is an annual award show aired in national broadcast syndication that honors artists in the music industry since 2014.

iHeartRadio Titanium Awards 
iHeartRadio Titanium Awards are awarded to an artist when their song reaches 1 Billion Spins across iHeartRadio Stations.

iHeartRadio MMVAs

Ivor Novello Awards

MOBO Awards
The MOBO Awards were established in 1996 by Kanya King to recognize artists on ethnicity or nationality in black music in the United Kingdom.

MTV Awards

MTV Video Music Awards
The MTV Video Music Awards were established in 1984 by MTV to celebrate the top music videos of the year. SZA has received eight nominations and won two awards.

MTV Europe Music Awards
The MTV Europe Music Awards are presented by Viacom International Media Networks. SZA has won one award out of four nominations.

MTV Millennial Awards

MTV Millennial Awards Brazil

NAACP Image Awards
An NAACP Image Award is an accolade presented by the American National Association for the Advancement of Colored People to honor outstanding people of color in film, television, music, and literature. SZA has won three awards.

People's Choice Awards
The People's Choice Awards is an American awards show, recognizing people in entertainment, voted online by the general public and fans. SZA is nominated for one award.

Satellite Awards 
The Satellite Awards is an award ceremony honoring the year's outstanding performers, films, television shows, home videos and interactive media, presented by the International Press Academy.

Soul Train Music Awards
The Soul Train Music Awards is an annual award show aired in national broadcast syndication that honors the best in African American music and entertainment established in 1987. SZA has won twice.

Teen Choice Awards

UK Music Video Awards

References 

Awards
SZA